The seventh season of The Voice Brasil, premiered on Rede Globo on July 17, 2018 in the 10:30 / 9:30 p.m. (BRT / AMT) slot immediately following the primetime telenovela Segundo Sol.

The show is again hosted by Tiago Leifert, with Mariana Rios serving as backstage host for the third consecutive year. Carlinhos Brown, Ivete Sangalo, Lulu Santos and Michel Teló also returned as the coaches.

For the first time, the show is airing during the Southern Hemisphere winter, following the spring airing of the past six seasons and also two times a week (Tuesdays and Thursdays). In addition, teams increased to 18, up from 12.

Léo Pain won the competition on September 27, 2018 with 50.01% of the final vote, marking Michel Teló's fourth straight win as a coach, a first in the entire The Voice franchise.

Teams
 Key

Blind auditions
A new feature within the Blind Auditions this season is the Block, which each coach can use once to prevent one of the other coaches from getting a contestant.

Key

Episode 1 (July 17) 
The Coaches performed País Tropical at the end of the show.

Episode 2 (July 19)

Episode 3 (July 24)

Episode 4 (July 26)

Episode 5 (July 31)

Episode 6 (Aug. 2)

Episode 7 (Aug. 7)

Episode 8 (Aug. 9)

The Battles
The 'block' twist, featured in the Blind Auditions, is also used in the Battle rounds. With this twist, each coach can use once to prevent one of the other coaches from getting a contestant in the "steals". Each coach is allowed to steal three losing artists from other teams, just like the first two seasons.

Key

The Live Playoffs

Live shows

Elimination chart
Artist's info

Result details

Week 1

Live Coaches' Battle 1

Live Coaches' Battle 2

Week 2

Live Coaches' Battle 3

Remix

Week 3

Round of 16

Quarterfinals

Week 4

Semifinals

Finals

Ratings and reception

Brazilian ratings
All numbers are in points and provided by Kantar Ibope Media.

 : Episode 16 was delayed to 11:30 PM BRT (10:30 PM AMT).
 : Episode 17 aired on Monday due to the Brazil vs. El Salvador friendly match on Tuesday.
 : Episodes 19 and 20 aired on Monday and Tuesday due to the Colo-Colo vs. Palmeiras quarterfinal match for the 2018 Copa Libertadores on Thursday.

 In 2018, each point represents 248.647 households in 15 market cities in Brazil (71.855 households in São Paulo)

References

External links
Official website on Gshow.com

7
2018 Brazilian television seasons